Mangifera pedicellata is a species of plant in the family Anacardiaceae. It is endemic to Java in Indonesia.

References

pedicellata
Endemic flora of Java
Vulnerable plants
Taxonomy articles created by Polbot
Taxa named by André Joseph Guillaume Henri Kostermans